Acclaimed Music is a website created by Henrik Franzon, a statistician from Stockholm, Sweden, in September 2001. Franzon has statistically aggregated hundreds of published lists that rank songs and albums into aggregated rankings by year, decade and all-time.  Lists that are submitted by readers to magazines or websites are excluded from the aggregation. Author Michaelangelo Matos writes that "Franzon's methods are imperfect, but as indicators of overall critical appeal go, it's hard to beat."

,  the site's aggregated lists name the Beach Boys' Pet Sounds (1966) as the most highly rated album of all time, and Bob Dylan's "Like a Rolling Stone" (1965) as the most highly rated song of all time. Additionally, the Beatles are the most acclaimed band, Dylan is the most acclaimed male solo artist, and Madonna is the most acclaimed female artist.

References

Further reading

Swedish music websites
Online music and lyrics databases
Internet properties established in 2001
English-language websites